Assisi Convent School may refer to:
 Assisi Convent School (Etah), Uttar Pradesh, India
 Assisi Convent Inter College, Baheri, Uttar Pradesh, India